Melissa Middleton (born June 6, 1982) is an American former professional tennis player.

Middleton, a right-handed player, was born and raised in Houston, Texas. A successful player in junior tennis, she won both the Easter Bowl and USTA National Clay Court Championships as an under 16 in 1996.

On the professional tour, Middleton reached a career best singles ranking of 225. In 1999 she featured as a wildcard in the US Open main draw and reached the second round of the Lipton Championships, with a first round win over Lori McNeil. As a doubles player she made it to 116 in the world and was a WTA Tour finalist in Memphis in 2002.

WTA Tour finals

Doubles (0-1)

ITF finals

Doubles: 5 (2–3)

References

External links
 
 

1982 births
Living people
American female tennis players
Tennis players from Houston